The wildlife of Russia inhabits terrain that extends across 12 time zones and from the tundra region in the far north to the Caucasus Mountains and prairies in the south, including temperate forests which cover 70% of the country's territory. Russia's forests comprise 22% of the forest in the world as well as 33% of all temperate forest in the world.

According to the data furnished in the Red Data Book of the Russian Federation, as of 1996,  there were 266 mammal species and 780 bird species under protection. Some of the threatened plant species are the Siberian cedar pine, Korean cedar pine in the far eastern part of the country, wild chestnut in the Caucasus. In the Russian Far East the mammals reported are brown bears, Eurasian lynx, and red deer, Amur tigers, Amur leopards, and Asiatic black bears. There are also about 350 bird species  and 30 percent of all endangered species in Russia are found here which include 48 unique endangered species. Carnivores under threat include the Siberian tiger, numbered at 400, and the Amur leopard of which only 30 remained as of 2003.

Geography

Geographically, the tundra habitat lies in the zone extending from the northern coast  to the south; this gradually transforms into the extensive and dense forests of the taiga that include a large part of Siberia and then into the gently sloping steppe land with trees only on the river banks. Three distinctive zones are the Caucasus in southern Russia, the active volcanic region of Kamchatka in the far northeast; and Ussuriland in the extreme southeast; in the latter, the indigenous animals and vegetation are akin to South East Asia rather than Siberia. 

Tundra region is totally in the Arctic Circle and is the most inhospitable terrain with ground permafrost extending to even to  depth of solid ice. Taiga is the largest forest in the world covering  and accounts for 25% of world's wood reserves. Winter season is the harshest with biting cold conditions. When snow melts here it becomes a "spongy wetland with lakes, pools and puddles" The steppe land lies from Voronezh and Senatov to Kuban area to north of the Caucasus. It extends into south western Siberia. The topography is flat and undulating with dominance of black soil. The region is drained by the Volga River forming a delta before it debouches into the Caspian Sea. The steppe "gives way to alpine regions in the Cauccasus with 6,000 highly varied plant species" Kamchatka region has the phenomenon of geothermal bubbling which has resulted in several volcanoes of which 30 are live. Ussuriland has a unique land feature of monsoon forests.

Russian wildlife has been categorized by World Wide Fund for Nature into 13 bioregions which, as of 2012, have 101 zapovedniks (strictly protected areas) covering more than 33.5 million hectares (82.7 million acres) and 38 national parks (protected areas with implemented zoning). Zapovedniks (pronounced: Zap-o-VED-nik) are strictly protected scientific nature reserves under IUCN category I. The Zapovednik, Barguzinsky, was the first  that was established in 1916 covering the eastern shore areas of Lake Baikal. The  cover the tundra region of the far north, the steppe (prairies) of the south, the Black Sea and the Bering Sea, encompassing a tremendous diversity of territory and play a critical role in nature conservation. The regions and the number of reserves in each of then are: eight in the Arctic region of Russia, twenty reserves in Kola-Karelian & Eastern European Forest, thirteen in the Eastern European Forest-Steppe, Steppe & Caspian Semi-Desert, nine in Ural Mountains, six in at Caucasus (also Prielbrusye National Park and Sochinsky National Park, four in Western Siberian Forest, four in Central Siberia, eight in Altai-Sayansky, four in Baikal (and Zabaykalsky National Park), four in Zabaikal, fifteen in Amur-Sakhalin and five in Kamchatka-Okhotsk Sea. UNESCO listed World Heritage Sites in these regions are: Virgin Komi Forests of the Urals, the Lake Baikal, the Volcanoes of Kamchatka, the Altai Mountains, the Western Caucasus, the Curonian Spit (the Kurshskaya Kosa National Park), the Central Sikhote-Alin, Uvs Lake Basin on the border with Mongolia,  and the Wrangel Island Reserve in the Chukchi Sea in the Russian Far East.

Legal framework
The Forest Legislation 1993 of the Russian Federation is the basic legal framework for forest management. The principle under this Legislation underlines the federal status of forests in enforcing compliance by all forest-users and governs the use of the forest stock, states the rules of forestry, reproduction, conservation and protection of forests and other norms and rules. The management of the Forest Fund is the responsibility of the Federal Forest Service, further delegated to the forest management districts.

The 250 animal species and 500 plant species listed in Russia's Red Book (as of 1984) are under the jurisdiction of the Ministry of Environmental Protection and Natural Resources (MEPNR), which is being updated. Non-game species are not included under legal protection.

A new draft of the forest code, which is a part of Russian law, governs the sale of the forest to private companies. Leasing of forests to private shows/firms regulated by the central government is given for a period up to 49 years.

Flora 
The ice fields of tundra are covered on the top by lichens, mosses, grasses and flowers, which for nine months are buried under snow. There are only a few trees and bushes here which are in a twisted dwarfed condition as their roots can not penetrate the permafrost. The taiga forest is densely populated with spruces, firs, pines and larch. On the forest floors grass, moss, lichen, berries and mushrooms are reported. The steppe consists of croplands and grass lands. In the Volga Delta, Caspian lotus flowers in pink and white spread across the water during the summer. The Caucasus region has 6,000 plant species of various types including wild flowers. In Ussuriland, there exists a lush monsoon forest quite different from the taiga forest, and in this, the trees and undergrowth are draped with lianas and vines.

Fauna

Due to extreme weather conditions, wildlife in the tundra is limited. Lemmings are among the rodents present. Other species present include Arctic fox, seals, walruses (near Chukotka), polar bears and whales. In the taiga forests, species include squirrels, chipmunks, voles and lemmings. The carnivores are polecats, brown bear, lynx, wolves, foxes, wolverines and the sable. Steppe animals include wild boar as well as 30 other mammal species. A small antelope species known a saiga antelope is also present but is under threat due to hunting. Animals species in the Caucasus region are tur (two species of mountain goat), bezoar (wild goat) endangered mouflon (mountain sheep), chamois (goat-antelope), Persian leopard, brown bear and bison. Avifauna species are bearded vulture (lammergeier), endangered griffon vulture, imperial eagle, peregrine falcon, goshawk, and snow cock. Spawning salmon are abundant in the rivers of peninsular Kamchatka on account of enrichment of the region by volcanic ash. Other animal species in this region are Kamchatkan brown bears, sea otters, and sea eagles (predators of salmon with  wingspan). Avifauna species number 200, including auks, tufted puffins and swans. The Siberian tiger is the most prominent species in Primorsky Krai; as of 2015 there were 480 to 540 remaining. The Amur leopard is also present; only 30 of these exist, and poaching threatens them. Other species include wolves, sables, and Asian black bears. Zov Tigra National Park has been established in this region to aid in conserving these species.

References

Bibliography

Russia
Biota of Russia